The Saints Peter and Paul Cathedral is a Roman Catholic cathedral in Ulaanbaatar, Mongolia, designed by Serbian architect Predak Stupar and consecrated in 2003 by Cardinal Crescenzio Sepe; its shape resembles that of a yurt.

It is the official episcopal see of the Apostolic Prefecture of Ulaanbaatar.

Building 
It has 36 semicircular windows and a window in the skylight. They were added by 2005, and were part of a project of Brother Mark, a member of the Taizé Community. The windows depict the four evangelists in their symbolic forms: an eagle, an angel, a yak and a snow leopard.  The latter two are the local reinterpretations of traditional Christian iconography, which replace the traditional winged bull and a winged lion.

References

External links 
 The cathedral on gcatholic.org

Roman Catholic churches completed in 2002
20th-century Roman Catholic church buildings
2002 establishments in Mongolia
Buildings and structures in Ulaanbaatar
Roman Catholic cathedrals in Mongolia
Churches in Mongolia